Taylor Eric Kemp (born July 23, 1990) is a former American soccer player.

Career

College and Amateur
Kemp played college soccer at the University of Maryland between 2009 and 2012.

Professional
Kemp was drafted 17th overall by D.C. United in the 2013 MLS SuperDraft. Upon a trial with United, Kemp was offered a contract. Due to team depth and the unlikeliness of many first team minutes, Kemp was loaned to United's USL Pro-affiliated, Richmond Kickers of the third tier. On April 6, 2013 in a match between Richmond and the Pittsburgh Riverhounds, Kemp started and played 90 minutes. Ahead of the April 27 fixture against Columbus, D.C. United recalled Kemp from loan.

The beginning of the 2014 MLS season saw Kemp primarily making appearances from the United bench and in Richmond, until August, when he was inserted into the United starting lineup at left back due to an injury to Chris Korb. From August on, Kemp locked down a starting position in the United lineup, creating two assists against the Colorado Rapids on August 7 and scoring a goal against the Houston Dynamo on October 12.

In the 2015 season, Kemp started 25 of United's 34 regular season matches. He contributed 6 assists as well as 1 goal, a long-range volley that won the MLS Goal of the Week award for Week 22.

During the 2018 season, Kemp struggled with injuries and didn't appear in any games.

On November 7, 2018, Kemp announced his retirement from playing professional soccer. At the time of his retirement, he was one of the only 24 players in D.C. United history to reach a 100 game milestone. In his career for D.C. United, he played 101 games, scored 3 goals, and contributed 14 assists.

International
On January 6, 2017 for the first time Kemp was called for the United States national team by coach Bruce Arena.

Honors

D.C. United
Lamar Hunt U.S. Open Cup: 2013

References

External links
 
 Maryland player profile

1990 births
Living people
American soccer players
Maryland Terrapins men's soccer players
Real Colorado Foxes players
D.C. United players
Richmond Kickers players
Soccer players from Colorado
Sportspeople from the Denver metropolitan area
D.C. United draft picks
USL League Two players
USL Championship players
Major League Soccer players
United States men's youth international soccer players
United States men's under-20 international soccer players
People from Highlands Ranch, Colorado
Association football defenders